Oldham is a town in the Metropolitan Borough of Oldham, Greater Manchester, England, and it is unparished.  The town and the surrounding countryside contain 101 listed buildings that are recorded in the National Heritage List for England.  Of these, four are listed at Grade II*, the middle grade, and the others are at Grade II, the lowest grade.

Until the coming of the Industrial Revolution, Oldham was a small settlement in an agricultural region.  By the early 19th century, it had become an important centre for handloom weaving.  The cotton spinning industry grew, initially though small firms, and later by large mills.  By the late 19th century "Oldham was the leading mill town in the world".  In the town were the factories of Platt Brothers, who were the largest manufacturers of cotton processing machines in the world.  Many of the cotton mills were designed by members of the firm of Stott and Sons.  Since the decline of the cotton industry, many mills have been demolished, and others have been converted for other uses.

The listed buildings reflect this history, the oldest ones being houses, farmhouses and farm buildings.  Then came houses with facilities for domestic weaving, with workshop windows in the upper storeys, and later the large cotton mills.  As the wealth of the town grew, so did the buildings, including churches, civic buildings and commercial buildings.  Local philanthropists contributed to some of the buildings, and they are commemorated in memorials.


Key

Buildings

References

Citations

Sources

Lists of listed buildings in Greater Manchester
Listed